Nar or NAR may refer to:

Music
 Nar (album) by Sahrawi musician Nayim Alal
 Nar, album by Mercan Dede
 New Alliance Records, an American punk, spoken word, music-label, active from 1980 to 1998
 , an Italian record label founded in 1980

Places

Asia
 Nar, Nepal, a village development committee in Manang District in the Gandaki Zone of northern Nepal
 Nar Jaffar Khan, a town and union council in Bannu District of Khyber-Pakhtunkhwa, Pakistan
 Nar Township, Samzhubzê District, Tibet
 Nar, Jammu and Kashmir, a small village in Kotli district, Pakistan-controlled Azad Kashmir

Europe
 När, a village on Gotland, Sweden
 River Nar, a river in the United Kingdom, and a tributary of the River Great Ouse
 Nar, North Ossetia–Alania, a village in North Ossetia–Alania, Russia

Political organisations
 National Alliance for Reconstruction, a political party in Trinidad and Tobago
 New Left Current, Greek communist organisation
 Nouvelle Action Royaliste, a political party in France
 Nuclei Armati Rivoluzionari, Italian right-wing terrorist group

Professional bodies
 National Association of Racing, governs horse racing tracks in Japan 
 National Association of Realtors, a North American real estate agent association
 National Association of Rocketry, governs model rocketry in the United States

Languages 
 Nar, a dialect of the Nar Phu language of Nepal
 Nar, a dialect of the Sar language of Chad
 nar, the ISO 639-3 code for the Guta language of Nigeria

Religion and mythology
 Nar, a dwarf of Norse mythology
 Native American religions, indigenous American religion
 New Apostolic Reformation, a dominionist Christian religious movement

Technology
 Nar Mobile, a mobile telecommunications company, located in Baku, Azerbaijan
 NAR 1 and/or NAR 2, Nastavni Računar (en. Educational Computer), theoretical models of educational computers
 North American Region, a regional reference used in the telecommunications industry

Other uses
 North American Review, a literary magazine founded in 1815
 Northern Alberta Railways, a former Canadian railway
 Nucleic Acids Research, a biology journal
 Nursing Assistants-Registered, a medical certification

See also
 NARS (disambiguation)